Louis Chenard was a French producer of automobiles, making cars at Colombes, near Paris from 1920 till 1932.   Louis Chenard was always a relatively low volume manufacturer.   Engines were bought in, mostly from Chapuis-Dornier.

There is no connection between Louis Chenard and the larger, better remembered Chenard & Walcker company.

The cars
Louis Chenard's first car was a 7/9CV presented in 1920, featuring a 4-cylinder 1¼-litre engine and 3 forward speeds.   4-speed transmissions and a choice of engines soon followed.

At the time of the 19th Paris Motor Show, in October 1924, the Louis Chenard range was focused on two models.    The "Louis Chenard Type D" competed in the 7HP class.    It was powered by a 1095cc overhead valve engine and sat on a  wheelbase.    The other model closely resembled the "Type D", but its 1495cc engine placed it in the 10HP class, and its  wheelbase made it slightly longer.   Fitted with "Torpedo" bodies the two models were in 1924 priced by the manufacturer at respectively 18,000 francs and 22,900 francs.

The same range was on offer two years later at the 20th Paris Motor Show in October 1926.   Prices had increased, however, and "Torpedo" bodied versions were in 1926 priced by the manufacturer at 26,950 francs (7HP) and 32,750 francs (10HP).

Competition
A Louis Chenard competed in the 24 Hour Race in 1924, driven by Louis Chenard himself (with a family member as a co-driver).   The car retired after 13 laps.   However, that year there were many early retirements, and Louis Chenard had kept going for long enough to be placed 32nd out of the 39 cars that started.

Reading list 
 Harald Linz, Halwart Schrader: Die Internationale Automobil-Enzyklopädie. United Soft Media Verlag, München 2008, . (German)
 George Nick Georgano (Chefredakteur): The Beaulieu Encyclopedia of the Automobile. Volume 3: P–Z. Fitzroy Dearborn Publishers, Chicago 2001, . (English)
 George Nick Georgano: Autos. Encyclopédie complète. 1885 à nos jours. Courtille, Paris 1975. (French)

Sources and notes

External links 

Defunct motor vehicle manufacturers of France
Cars introduced in 1920
Vehicle manufacturing companies established in 1920
Vehicle manufacturing companies disestablished in 1932
1920 establishments in France
1932 disestablishments in France